Meroctena tullalis is a moth in the family Crambidae. It was described by Francis Walker in 1859. It is found in what was then India (North Hindustan, Silhet) (now Bangladesh), Fiji and Samoa.

References

Moths described in 1859
Spilomelinae